Natranaerofaba is a monotypic genus in the monotypic family of Natranaerofabaceae. The only described species is Natranaerofaba carboxydovora.

References

Monotypic bacteria genera
Taxa described in 2021
Natranaerobiales

Bacteria described in 2021